is the sixth studio album by Japanese idol duo Pink Lady, released through VAP on June 21, 1984. It was the duo's reunion album after having disbanded in 1981. Following the concert tour to promote the album, Mie and Keiko Masuda once again went their separate ways to focus on their solo careers until their second reformation in 1989.

Track listing 
All music is arranged by Makoto Matsushita.

Personnel
 MIE and Keiko Masuda - vocals
 Michiko Ogata - backing vocals
 Toshio Oguri - backing vocals
 Makoto Matsushita - guitar, keyboards, backing vocals
 Masato Matsuda - keyboards
 Yasuo Tomikura - bass
 Naoki Watanabe - bass ("Konya wa Lonely")
 Masahiro Miyazaki - drums
 Toshihiro Nakanishi - conductor
 Maeda Strings - string orchestra
 Eiji Arai Group - horns
 Susumu Kazuhara Group - horns

References

External links
 

1984 albums
Japanese-language albums
Pink Lady (band) albums